Aleksejs Šarando (born 1 January 1964) is a former football midfielder from Latvia, currently the assistant manager of Skonto FC-2 in the Latvian First League. He obtained a total number of 24 caps for the Latvia national team between 1993 and 1999, scoring two goals. His last club was FK Rīga, where he retired in 2001. Šarando also played as a professional in Russia, Finland and Sweden.

Honours
 Baltic Cup
 1993

References
 

1964 births
Living people
Latvian footballers
Association football midfielders
Latvia international footballers
Latvian expatriate footballers
Expatriate footballers in Sweden
Expatriate footballers in Finland
Expatriate footballers in Russia
Latvian expatriate sportspeople in Russia
FK Rīga players
FK RFS players
FC Neftekhimik Nizhnekamsk players